Votolato is a surname. Notable people with the surname include:

Cody Votolato (born 1982), American rock guitarist
Rocky Votolato (born 1977), American singer-songwriter